The 2019–20 NHL season was the 103rd season of operation (102nd season of play) of the National Hockey League. The regular season began on October 2, 2019, with playoffs originally planned for April and the Stanley Cup Finals planned for June. The season was suspended indefinitely on March 12, 2020, due to the COVID-19 pandemic.

On May 22, 2020, the NHL and National Hockey League Players' Association (NHLPA) agreed to a framework for the resumption of play, which would see the remainder of the regular season scrapped, and the top 12 teams in each conference (by points percentage) competing in a modified and expanded Stanley Cup playoffs, which the NHL planned to hold in two centralized "hub cities", Toronto's Scotiabank Arena and Edmonton's Rogers Place, with no spectators and only essential staff present.

The playoffs began on August 1, 2020, and ended on September 28, with the Tampa Bay Lightning defeating the Dallas Stars in the Stanley Cup Finals in six games, winning their second Stanley Cup in franchise history.

League business

Collective bargaining agreement
The collective bargaining agreement (CBA), previously signed to end the 2012–13 NHL lockout, entered into its eighth season. Before the season started, both the NHL and the NHLPA had the choice to opt out of the CBA on September 1 and September 16, 2019, respectively. If either of them had opted out, the CBA would have expired at the end of this season instead of at the end of 2021–22. The NHL announced on August 30 that they would not opt out, and the NHLPA then also agreed on September 16 not to opt out.

Salary cap
The salary cap is $81.5 million, as announced on June 22, 2019.

Seattle expansion team
Due to the COVID-19 pandemic, the christening of the Seattle Kraken was delayed to July 23, 2020. The expansion team, set to begin play during the 2021–22 season, originally planned to announce the club's name in early 2020.

Ron Francis was hired as Seattle's first general manager on July 17, 2019.

Rule changes
The following rule changes were proposed June 19, 2019 and approved the next day:

The league adopted the David Leggio Rule: deliberately moving the goalposts off its moorings to stop play on a breakaway will result in an awarded goal to the attacking team.
In the event a net is inadvertently knocked off its moorings, or if a puck shot from beyond center ice is stopped and frozen by the goaltender, the face-off will take place in the goaltender's defensive zone, with the team on offense given choice of side. In such cases, the defensive team will not be allowed to make a line change.
A puck that leaves play in the attacking zone will remain in the attacking zone for the next face-off.
Players who lose their helmet during play must return to the bench as soon as it is feasible until it can be replaced, or the player must retrieve their helmet.
Linesmen will now drop the puck at centre ice after goals and at the start of overtime instead of the referees.

Expansion of video review
 Teams now have an unlimited number of coach's challenges, but failed challenges will now result in delay-of-game penalties instead of the loss of their timeout. The first failed challenge will result in a two-minute minor, and each subsequent failed challenge will result in a four-minute double-minor.
 A team may challenge goals that follow plays in the attacking zone that should have instead resulted in a stoppage before the puck went into the net. Missed stoppages include hand passes, pucks high-sticked to a teammate, and pucks hitting the netting or going into the players bench. The delay-of-game penalty for pucks going over the glass will still not be reviewable under this situation.
 All match and major penalties excluding fighting will be required to video review; officials will reserve the authority to reduce the penalty to a minor penalty depending on the result of the review, but referees cannot rescind a penalty altogether.
 Referees have the option to review high-sticking double minors at their discretion and without consultation with the NHL's Situation Room.
 The league eliminates the use of goal judges and assigns those duties to the in-house video replay official.

Modification to the tie-breaking procedure
To put more emphasis on teams winning in regulation, regulation wins (tracked in an additional RW column in the league standings) will now precede regulation and overtime wins (ROW) in the tie-breaking procedure. The league also added goals scored as a new tiebreaker.

Player and puck tracking technology
After testing at the 2019 National Hockey League All-Star Game, the NHL planned to deploy player and puck tracking systems to all 31 NHL arenas prior to the start of the 2019–20 season. This technology was developed in collaboration with a German Fraunhofer Institute using transmitters embedded inside pucks and jerseys. It enables on-air features such as speed displays, puck tracking graphics (reminiscent of the FoxTrax graphics utilized in the late 1990s by previous U.S. national NHL broadcaster Fox, also developed by Sportvision), and marker graphics hovering above players.

On September 5, 2019, it was reported that the league replaced its primary technology partner in its tracking technology, and thus the system likely would not be up and running until the 2020 playoffs at the earliest.

Media rights
This is the ninth season under the NHL's ten-year deal with NBC Sports and sixth season of its twelve-year Canadian rights deal with Sportsnet and TVA Sports.

Both NBC Sports and Sportsnet celebrated International Women's Day on March 8, 2020, by featuring all-female broadcasting crews on their respective telecasts of St. Louis Blues–Chicago Blackhawks and Vegas Golden Knights–Calgary Flames.

On January 2, 2019, the Chicago Blackhawks agreed to an exclusive multi-year deal with NBC Sports Chicago beginning with the 2019–20 season, ending the team's broadcasts on WGN-TV.

Sinclair Broadcast Group and Entertainment Studios combined to purchase the former Fox Sports regional networks (FSN). Twelve of the NHL's 31 teams (Anaheim, Arizona, Carolina, Columbus, Dallas, Detroit, Los Angeles, Florida, Minnesota, Nashville, St. Louis, and Tampa Bay) carry their television broadcasts through FSN. FSN was one of the properties Fox Corporation's predecessor 21st Century Fox divested in its sale to The Walt Disney Company, but which The Walt Disney Company could not keep due to antitrust concerns. This is Entertainment Studios' first entry into sports, while Sinclair has had a sports operation since 2014 that currently distributes the free-to-air network Stadium and is concurrently expanding into the regional sports network business with its stakes in these networks, YES Network and the upcoming Chicago-based Marquee Sports Network. The FSN networks will continue to temporarily use the Fox Sports name under a transitional license agreement while Sinclair explores rebranding options.

In August 2019, the Vegas Golden Knights agreed to a deal with Las Vegas broadcast television station KTNV-TV to locally televise all of the team's 2019 preseason games over-the-air.

In September 2019, the New York Islanders agreed to a two-year deal with WEPN-AM and WEPN-FM to broadcast a majority of their games. Since the two stations also broadcast New York Rangers and the NBA's New York Knicks games, WRHU of Hofstra University will continue to be used by the Islanders as an overflow station.

This is the final season of Sportsnet's regional rights to the Calgary Flames and Edmonton Oilers. In December 2019, after having aired the first-ever NHL broadcast in the language earlier in the year, it was announced that the Aboriginal Peoples Television Network (APTN) would air six of Sportsnet's Hometown Hockey games per season in Plains Cree over the next three years.

Personnel
On November 11, 2019, Sportsnet fired studio commentator Don Cherry for comments that suggested Canadian immigrants benefit from the sacrifices of veterans but do not wear Remembrance Day poppies. The segment Coach's Corner on Hockey Night in Canada was canceled the following week.

This was the final season for lead NBC play-by-play announcer Mike Emrick. Emrick announced his retirement from broadcasting on October 19, 2020, after a 47-year career.

Carolina Hurricanes play-by-play announcer John Forslund was replaced by rinkside reporter Mike Maniscalco prior to the 2020 Stanley Cup playoffs. Forslund had been the television voice of the Whalers/Hurricanes franchise since 1995, and added radio play-by-play in 2018 after the team removed Chuck Kaiton from the position.

Sports betting
As part of its renovations, the Philadelphia Flyers and Wells Fargo Center announced that Rivers Casino Philadelphia (then SugarHouse Casino) would become the venue's official sportsbook partner, with the venue adding two lounge areas with odds boards to promote the casino's sports betting app.

Draft
The 2019 NHL Entry Draft was held on June 21 and 22, 2019, with Jack Hughes being selected first overall by the New Jersey Devils.

Preseason games in Europe
Two preseason games were played in Europe. The Chicago Blackhawks played against Eisbären Berlin at Mercedes-Benz Arena in Berlin, Germany, on September 29, 2019. The Philadelphia Flyers played against Lausanne HC at Vaudoise Aréna in Lausanne, Switzerland on September 30, 2019.

General Manager of the Year Award
On November 19, 2019, the NHL announced it would rename the General Manager of the Year Award in honour of Jim Gregory, the recently deceased former general manager of the Toronto Maple Leafs and former NHL executive. The official name is changed to the "Jim Gregory General Manager of the Year Award."

Coaching changes

(*) Indicates interim.

Front office changes

(*) Indicates interim.

Regular season
The regular season began on October 2, 2019, and was originally supposed to end on April 4, 2020, but due to the COVID-19 pandemic, the season was suspended on March 12, 2020. On May 26, 2020, it was announced that the regular season would not be finished.

International games
Three regular season games, branded as the NHL Global Series, were played in Europe. The Chicago Blackhawks and Philadelphia Flyers played their regular season opening game on October 4, 2019, at O2 Arena in Prague, Czech Republic. The Buffalo Sabres and Tampa Bay Lightning played two games at Ericsson Globe in Stockholm, Sweden, on November 8 and 9, 2019.

Outdoor games
Three outdoor games were held during the 2019–20 season:
 The Heritage Classic was held on October 26, 2019, at Mosaic Stadium in Regina, Saskatchewan, featuring the Calgary Flames and the Winnipeg Jets.
 The Winter Classic was held on January 1, 2020, at Cotton Bowl in Dallas, Texas, featuring the Nashville Predators and the Dallas Stars.
 The Stadium Series was held on February 15, 2020, at Falcon Stadium in Colorado Springs, Colorado, featuring the Los Angeles Kings and the Colorado Avalanche.

All-Star Game

The 2020 National Hockey League All-Star Game was held in St. Louis, Missouri, at Enterprise Center, the home of the St. Louis Blues, on January 25, 2020.

Postponed game
The St. Louis Blues – Anaheim Ducks game on February 11, 2020, was suspended at a 1−1 tie with 7:50 left in the first period after Blues defenceman Jay Bouwmeester collapsed on the bench in a medical emergency due to a cardiac episode. He eventually had an implantable cardioverter-defibrillator procedure and was placed on injured reserve. The game was made up on March 11. This resulted in the Blues' home game against the Florida Panthers being moved one day earlier from March 10 to March 9.

Suspension of the regular season due to COVID-19
As the COVID-19 pandemic spread across the globe, concern began to build that large crowds at sporting events would spread the virus that causes COVID-19. In early March 2020, the NHL suspended media access to the locker rooms, saying that only official personnel would be allowed in after the games to limit person-to-person contact. The San Jose Sharks were planning to play three home games without fans from March 19, following San Francisco's order prohibiting assemblies larger than 1,000 individuals. Meanwhile, the Columbus Blue Jackets had also proposed to play home games without fans, due to Ohio governor Mike DeWine banning mass gatherings in the state.

But after the National Basketball Association (NBA) suspended all games when Rudy Gobert and another player tested positive for COVID-19 on the day that the World Health Organization declared the disease to be a pandemic, the NHL scheduled a meeting to discuss pausing the season. On March 12, morning practice sessions and media access for all teams were cancelled. Shortly after, they announced that the 2019–20 season had been paused indefinitely. This became the biggest interruption to regular NHL season games since the 2012–13 NHL lockout. All players and hockey staff were asked to self-quarantine in their home cities until further notice.

One of the players from the Ottawa Senators had tested positive for COVID-19 on March 17. Four days later, on March 21, it was announced that a second Senators player tested positive for COVID-19. Two Colorado Avalanche players also tested positive for the virus. On April 4, the originally intended date for the final games of the regular season, Commissioner Gary Bettman participated in a call with U.S. president Donald Trump and other sport commissioners on the state of the sport world.

Return to play with modified playoff format 
On May 22, the league and the NHLPA agreed on a basic framework to stage a 24-team playoff tournament behind closed doors. The details of the plan were announced publicly on May 26. The seeds would be based on each club's points percentage when the season paused on March 12 (effectively scrapping the remainder of the regular season and making this the first season in NHL history where some teams played more regular season games than others in a year that did not have a team fold during the regular season). The top four seeds in each conference would get a bye, while the next eight seeds in each conference would play in a best-of-five series. Many of the logistics still needed to be negotiated, including COVID-19 testing protocols, visas, and whether these games would be held in one or more "hub" cities as the Canada–United States border would remain closed to non-essential travel until June 21. That same day, the U.S. government announced that foreign athletes would be exempted from pandemic-related travel bans still in effect.

On May 26, Bettman formally discussed aspects of the "Return to Play Plan", including the proposed 24-team playoff format (with the top four teams in each conference playing a round robin tournament under regular season overtime rules to determine their seeds), and modifications to the procedures for the Draft Lottery. Aspects of the format (including the possibility of a best-of-five format for the first and second round, and changes to bracketing) were still being negotiated, but it was stated that the conference finals and Stanley Cup Finals would still use a best-of-seven series. Bettman stated that at least two hub cities would be used for the playoffs, shortlisting hosts such as Chicago, Columbus, Dallas, Edmonton, Las Vegas, Los Angeles, Minneapolis, Pittsburgh, Toronto and Vancouver. Health, testing, and security protocols would be in place at these sites.

On June 4, it was announced that the NHL and NHLPA had approved aspects of the format that had not yet been finalized during the May 26 briefing, with the first and second rounds proper using a best-of-seven format as usual, and all teams being reseeded after each round (to account for the lack of home advantage due to all games being played at a neutral site).

It was reported that the NHL planned to have one American host and one Canadian host. As Canada's Quarantine Act at the time required all travellers entering the country to self-isolate for 14 days on arrival, Deputy Commissioner Bill Daly stated that this may impact the ability to use Canadian host cities unless these issues can be addressed. On June 10, British Columbia Premier John Horgan stated that the province's medical officer Bonnie Henry had endorsed proposed protocols developed by the Vancouver Canucks in collaboration with local officials, and that they were being sent to Prime Minister Justin Trudeau for federal approval. These included allowing the NHL to "cohort" players and restrict their access to the general public.

Phase 2 of the "Return to Play Plan" began on June 8. Players were allowed to resume use of team practice facilities in small groups (no more than six), with only players allowed on-ice and no other agents or press admitted. Players had to self-isolate for 14 days if they used public transport, and were regularly monitored and tested for COVID-19. If a player tests positive, they could not attend training until they had been cleared, with teams suggested to use guidelines issued by the U.S. Centers for Disease Control and Prevention (CDC). Training camps (phase 3) were planned to reopen on July 10. Amidst an intense growth of new cases in Florida, the Tampa Bay Lightning temporarily closed their training facility on June 19 after several staff members and three players tested positive for COVID-19.

On June 24, Sportsnet reported that Vancouver's bid had been complicated by disagreements over protocols for positive cases. The next day, Global BC's Richard Zussman reported that the NHL had "moved on [for now]" from Vancouver, and was increasing its focus on Edmonton and Toronto as potential sites. While Las Vegas was initially considered a front-runner, a spike of cases in Nevada and other U.S. states led to reports on July 1 that the NHL had decided on Edmonton and Toronto as the sites.

On July 10, the NHL confirmed that it had ratified agreements with the NHLPA to begin the playoffs on August 1 (concluding no later than early October), with games being hosted by Edmonton (Western Conference early rounds, Conference Finals, and Stanley Cup Finals) and Toronto (Eastern Conference early rounds). The league also renewed its collective bargaining agreement (CBA) for four additional seasons, which includes an increase to minimum player salaries and a 10% deference of player salaries for the 2020–21 season (to be paid out over three seasons beginning 2022–23).

Standings

Eastern Conference

Western Conference

Tiebreaking procedures
 Fewer number of games played (only used during regular season).
 Greater number of regulation wins (denoted by RW).
 Greater number of wins in regulation and overtime (excluding shootout wins; denoted by ROW).
 Greater number of total wins (including shootouts).
 Greater number of points earned in head-to-head play; if teams played an uneven number of head-to-head games, the result of the first game on the home ice of the team with the extra home game is discarded.
 Greater goal differential (difference between goals for and goals against).
 Greater number of goals scored (denoted by GF).

Playoffs

Seeding round-robin
The top four teams in each conference played in a separate seeding round-robin to determine their seeding in the First Round. These games were played with regular season overtime and shootout rules, with the clubs accumulating points like the regular season, and any ties in the round-robin standings were broken by the regular season points percentage.

Eastern Conference

Western Conference

Bracket

Statistics

Scoring leaders
The following players led the league in regular season points at the completion of the regular season.

Leading goaltenders
The following goaltenders led the league in regular season goals against average at the conclusion of games played on March 11, 2020, while playing at least 1,740 minutes.

NHL awards

Due to the COVID-19 pandemic, the NHL will not hold an annual awards ceremony for this season. Instead, the individual awards will be handed out during the final two rounds of the Stanley Cup playoffs. Voting concluded immediately after the end of the regular season. Statistics-based awards such as the Art Ross Trophy, Maurice "Rocket" Richard Trophy, William M. Jennings Trophy and the Presidents' Trophy are announced at the end of the regular season. The Prince of Wales Trophy and the Clarence S. Campbell Bowl are presented at the end of the Eastern and Western Conference Finals respectively. The Stanley Cup and the Conn Smythe Trophy are presented at the end of the Stanley Cup Finals. The Lester Patrick Trophy is announced following the conclusion of the playoffs and presented in the fall.

All-Star teams

Milestones

First games
The following is a list of notable players who played their first NHL game during the 2019–20 season, listed with their first team.

Adam Fox, New York Rangers
Jack Hughes, New Jersey Devils
Igor Shesterkin, New York Rangers

Last games
The following is a list of notable players who played their final NHL game during the 2019–20 season, listed with their team.

Ben Bishop, Dallas Stars
Jay Bouwmeester, St. Louis Blues
Corey Crawford, Chicago Blackhawks 
Trevor Daley, Detroit Red Wings
Mike Green, Edmonton Oilers 
Dan Hamhuis, Nashville Predators
Jimmy Howard, Detroit Red Wings 
Henrik Lundqvist, New York Rangers 
Brent Seabrook, Chicago Blackhawks 
Alexander Steen, St. Louis Blues 
Justin Williams, Carolina Hurricanes

Major milestones reached
 On October 8, 2019, Florida Panthers defenceman Keith Yandle became the fifth player in NHL history and the first American-born to play in 800 consecutive games.
 On October 12, 2019, Arizona Coyotes forward Phil Kessel played his 1,000th NHL game, becoming the 338th player to reach the mark.
 On October 20, 2019, Winnipeg Jets head coach Paul Maurice won his 700th game, becoming the seventh head coach to reach that mark.
 On November 3, 2019, Anaheim Ducks forward Ryan Getzlaf played his 1,000th NHL game, becoming the 339th player to reach the mark.
 On November 5, 2019, Boston Bruins defenceman Zdeno Chara played his 1,500th NHL game.
 On November 13, 2019, Dallas Stars forward Corey Perry played his 1,000th NHL game, becoming the 340th player to reach the mark.
 On November 16, 2019, Florida Panthers head coach Joel Quenneville won his 900th game, becoming the second coach in NHL history to reach the mark.
 On November 16, 2019, Los Angeles Kings forward Jeff Carter played his 1,000th NHL game, becoming the 341st player to reach the mark.
 On December 1, 2019, Edmonton Oilers forwards Connor McDavid and Leon Draisaitl became the first set of teammates to have 50 points in 29 games since Mario Lemieux, Jaromir Jagr and Ron Francis did so with the Pittsburgh Penguins in 1995–96.
 On December 1, 2019, Minnesota Wild forward Mikko Koivu played his 1,000th NHL game, becoming the 342nd player to reach the mark.
 On December 9, 2019, Washington Capitals equipment manager Craig "Woody" Leydig worked his 2,500th NHL game.
 On December 14, 2019, San Jose Sharks defenceman Marc-Edouard Vlasic played his 1,000th NHL game, becoming the 343rd player to reach the mark.
 On December 15, 2019, Minnesota Wild forward Eric Staal became the 89th player in NHL history to score 1,000 points.
 On December 20, 2019, Dallas Stars forward Joe Pavelski played his 1,000th NHL game, becoming the 344th player to reach the mark.
 On January 9, 2020, Nashville Predators goaltender Pekka Rinne became the 12th goaltender in NHL history to score a goal in an NHL game.
 On January 19, 2020, Chicago Blackhawks forward Patrick Kane became the 90th player in NHL history to score 1,000 points
 On February 1, 2020, Detroit Red Wings forward Valtteri Filppula played his 1,000th NHL game, becoming the 345th player to reach the mark.
 On February 1, 2020, St. Louis Blues forward Alexander Steen played his 1,000th NHL game, becoming the 346th player to reach the mark.
 On February 4, 2020, San Jose Sharks forward Joe Thornton became the 14th player to score 1,500 points.
 On February 7, 2020, Columbus Blue Jackets goaltender Elvis Merzlikins became the first rookie goaltender to have five shutouts in an eight-game span since Frank Brimsek (1938–39).
 On February 7, 2020, Minnesota Wild forward Zach Parise played his 1,000th NHL game, becoming the 347th player to reach the mark.
 On February 13, 2020, Dallas Stars forward Andrew Cogliano played his 1,000th NHL game, becoming the 348th player to reach the mark.
 On February 22, 2020, Washington Capitals forward Alexander Ovechkin scored his 700th career goal, becoming the eighth player to reach the mark.
 On August 11, 2020, Columbus Blue Jackets goaltender Joonas Korpisalo set a modern NHL record with 85 saves in a single game, surpassing Kelly Hrudey in 1987.
 On August 11, 2020, Columbus Blue Jackets defenceman Seth Jones set a modern NHL record of time on ice in a single playoff game, 65:06.
 On September 26, 2020, Dallas Stars forward Joe Pavelski scored his 61st playoff goal, surpassing Joe Mullen as the all-time playoff goal scorer by a United States-born player.

Uniforms
 The Buffalo Sabres introduced a 50th-anniversary third jersey that is plain white, with old gold trim and navy blue lettering. It was the last season the team used navy blue; a royal blue jersey will be introduced in 2020–21.
 The Carolina Hurricanes introduced a new road jersey, featuring the wordmark "Canes" written diagonally across the front. The jersey also incorporates the Hurricanes' secondary logo introduced by the team's alternate jersey during the previous season.
 The Los Angeles Kings introduced a 1990s throwback jersey for the 2019–20 season, which was inspired by the Kings' white home jersey worn from 1988 to 1998. The team was scheduled to wear the jersey twice during the season.
 The St. Louis Blues introduced a 1990s throwback jersey for the 2019–20 season, which was inspired by the Blues' blue road jersey worn from 1995 to 1998. The team was scheduled to wear the jersey in three home games during the season.
 The Vancouver Canucks, to coincide with the 50th anniversary of the franchise in the NHL, introduced updated home and away jerseys worn during the season, featuring a revised stick-in-rink shoulder logo and the removal of the radially-arched "VANCOUVER" across the chest. The Canucks also wore brand new third jerseys for select games, featuring the updated stick-in-rink logo and striping based on their original 1970 uniforms. In addition, the Canucks wore their 1990s throwback jerseys for select games. The design was chosen via an online vote over two other throwback jersey options.

See also
 2019–20 NHL transactions
 List of 2019–20 NHL Three Star Awards
 2019–20 NHL suspensions and fines
 2019 in sports
 2020 in sports
 COVID-19 pandemic in Canada 
 COVID-19 pandemic in the United States
 Impact of the COVID-19 pandemic on sports

References

External links
 

 
NHL